Khabr (also Romanized as Khabr) is a village in Khabr Rural District, in the Central District of Baft County, Kerman Province, Iran. At the 2006 census, its population was 1,685, in 387 families.

References 

Populated places in Baft County